Łośno   is a village in the administrative district of Gmina Kłodawa, within Gorzów County, Lubusz Voivodeship, in western Poland.

References

Villages in Gorzów County